Natália Azevedo Gaudio (born 18 December 1992) is a Brazilian individual rhythmic gymnast. She is the 2018 South American Games all-around gold medalist, and the 2019 Pan American Games all-around bronze medalist.

Personal life 
Gaudio speaks 3 languages: English, Portuguese, and Spanish. Her hobbies are going to the beach and travelling. Her rhythmic gymnastics idol is Ukrainian Ganna Rizatdinova.

Career 
Gaudio started rhythmic gymnastics to 6 years old after she saw some friends practising gymnastics and decided to join them. At 8 years of age she was the runner-up in the All-around rhythmic gymnastics in the state of Espirito Santo, Brazil. Gaudio made her international debut in competitions at 14 years of age, since then she has represented her nation at international competitions.

At the 2014 South American Games, Gaudio won the all-around silver medal behind teammate Angélica Kvieczynski, in the apparatus finals; she won gold in ball, clubs, silver in ribbon and bronze in hoop. She competed at the 2015 Pan American Games where she finished 8th in the all-around, an improvement from her 10th-place finish at the 2011 Pan American Games.

Gaudio has competed at world championships including at the 2014 and at the 2015 World Rhythmic Gymnastics Championships where she was the highest ranked Brazilian rhythmic gymnast ahead of teammate Angélica Kvieczynski. Gaudio also competed at the 2016 Gymnastics Olympic Test Event in Rio de Janeiro and qualified through a wildcard entry for the 2016 Rio Olympics as an automatic berth for the host country of the Olympics. She finished 21st in the all-around at the 2016 Minsk World Cup. On July 1–3, Gaudio competed at the 2016 Berlin World Cup finishing 17th in the all-around.

On August 19–20, Gaudio competed at the 2016 Summer Olympics held in Rio de Janeiro, Brazil. She finished 23rd in the rhythmic gymnastics individual all-around qualifications and did not advance into the top 10 finals.

On August 11–13, Gaudio competed at the 2017 Kazan World Challenge Cup finishing 30th in the all-around. On August 30 - September 3, Gaudio competed at the 2017 World Championships in Pesaro, Italy; finishing 35th in the all-around qualifications and thus not making the top 24 all-around finalists.

In 2018, Gaudio competed at the 2018 Guadalajara World Challenge Cup finishing 31st in the all-around.

In 2019, Gaudio competed at the 2019 Pan American Games in Lima finishing 3rd in the all around, qualifying for the hoop, clubs and ribbon finals.

See also
 List of Olympic rhythmic gymnasts for Brazil

References

External links 
 
 
 
 

1992 births
Living people
Brazilian rhythmic gymnasts
Place of birth missing (living people)
Gymnasts at the 2011 Pan American Games
Gymnasts at the 2015 Pan American Games
Gymnasts at the 2019 Pan American Games
Gymnasts at the 2016 Summer Olympics
Olympic gymnasts of Brazil
Pan American Games bronze medalists for Brazil
Pan American Games medalists in gymnastics
South American Games gold medalists for Brazil
South American Games silver medalists for Brazil
South American Games bronze medalists for Brazil
South American Games medalists in gymnastics
Competitors at the 2014 South American Games
Competitors at the 2018 South American Games
Medalists at the 2019 Pan American Games
20th-century Brazilian women
21st-century Brazilian women